Rhampholeon bruessoworum, the Mount Inago pygmy chameleon, is a small species of chameleon endemic to Mozambique. It was described in 2014. It has been found in small patches of wet forest at the base of the Mount Inago granitic inselberg. It is only known from that locality. The lizard occurs in highly fragmented and threatened portions. Its habitat quality is degrading, with pressures from logging for agricultural land and commercial logging operations. Because of its reduced and threatened habitat, it is considered Critically Endangered on the IUCN Red List.

References

Rhampholeon
Reptiles of Mozambique
Endemic fauna of Mozambique
Reptiles described in 2014
Taxa named by William Roy Branch
Taxa named by Krystal A. Tolley